Adjustierung (literal: adjustation | AT: [Dienstkleidung], en: service dress) is derived from the German (Austrian) verb adjustieren (AT: [ausrüsten], en: equip) is in Austrian armed forces the generic term to a defined type uniform, as well as the paraphrase to a specific dress and equipment to be worn by military personnel. However, another historical designation to military uniform, e.g. in the Austro-Hungarian Army (1867–1918), was Montur, and in the Prussian Army Montierung. 

Today the Austrian Bundesheer discriminates the different kinds of Adjustierung (mil. dress and equipment | adjustation) as follows:
Paradeadjustierung (en: parade adjustation)
Marschadjustierung / Feldadjustierung (en: march adjustation / field adjustation)
Gebirgsadjustierung (en: mountain adjustation)

In the German Bundeswehr is Anzugsordnung (en: dress order) the equivalent to the Austrian Adjustierung. Until 1945 the designation Waffenrock was commonly used.

Kinds of military adjustation

See also
Glossary of German military terms
Rank insignia of the Austro-Hungarian armed forces
Tunic (military)
Waffenfarbe (Austria)

References

Further reading
Rest, Ortner, Illming Des Kaisers Rock im 1. Weltkrieg Edition Militaria Vienna 2002 
 Adjustierungsvorschrift für die k. u. k. gemeinsame Armee, die k.k. Landwehr, die k.u. Landwehr, die verbundenen Einrichtungen und das Corps der Militär-Beamten. (Theil III) Herausgegeben mit Genehmigung des k.u.k. Kriegsministeriums durch die k.u.k. Hofdruckerei von Erich Christl, Bozen 1912.
 Johann C. Allmayer-Beck, Erich Lessing: Die K.u.k. Armee. 1848-1918. Verlag Bertelsmann, München 1974, .
 Stefan Rest: Des Kaisers Rock im ersten Weltkrieg. Verlag Militaria, Wien 2002, 
 Das k.u.k. Heer im Jahre 1895 Schriften des Heeresgeschichtlichen Museums in Wien - Leopold Stocker Verlag, Graz 1997, 

Military uniforms
Military equipment of Austria-Hungary
Military equipment of Austria
Military history of Austria-Hungary